Sir John See  (14 October 184431 January 1907) was a member of the New South Wales Legislature from 26 November 1880 to 15 June 1901, and was then Premier of New South Wales from 1901 to 1904.

See was a self-made man of strong character, an excellent business man and a sound politician. He was well regarded by both sides of politics, for Labour politicians judged that the establishment of the State clothing factory during his administration  had a great influence in abolishing sweating, and that the right to women to vote for New South Wales parliament, although not to stand for it, was also introduced. The governor of New South Wales at the time of his Premiership, the 7th Earl of Beauchamp, privately judged See to be "a self made man of good heart but a most pushing and disagreeable manner".

Early life
See was the son of Joseph See, a farm-labourer, and his wife Mary Ann née Bailey, and was born in Yelling, Huntingdon, England. The Parish Records of his baptism show that he was christened "See or Seekings" and that his parents/grandparents etc. used both surnames. He was brought to Australia in 1852 by his parents who settled on the Hunter River in New South Wales. On the family move to Australia they no longer used the "Seekings" surname. After three years at school See worked on the family farm, but in 1863 took up land with a brother on the Clarence River. In 1865, following disastrous floods, he went to Sydney and began business as a produce dealer. The business flourished under the name of John See and Company. He also became a partner in a small coastal shipping company, Nipper and See, which was afterwards floated into a company, as the North Coast Steam Navigation Company. See was a shrewd investor and became very well known in business circles in Sydney. In 1876, he married Charlotte Mary Matthews. See built a mansion called 'Urara' (now known as Milford House Nursing Home) in the Sydney suburb of Randwick and served on Randwick Council as alderman and mayor. He became a director of several well-known companies, a trustee of the Savings Bank of New South Wales, and president of the Royal Agricultural Society. In 1891, his shipping line had 14 steamships when it merged with another line to form the North Coast Steam Navigation Co. Ltd and he remained its joint managing director until his death. He also acquired property throughout the state, including Yester Grange.

Political career

See entered politics in 1880 as member for Grafton and remained its member until he retired in 1904. In October 1885 he joined the George Dibbs government as Postmaster-General, but Dibbs was defeated before the end of the year. See was not in office again until October 1891 when he became for nearly three years Colonial Treasurer in the third Dibbs ministry. He was in charge of the bill which brought in the first protectionist tariff in New South Wales. The whole of his period as Treasurer was marked by much financial stress throughout Australia. From August 1894 until September 1899, George Reid was in power, but when William Lyne came in, See was his Colonial Secretary.

On Lyne transferring to federal politics in March 1901, See became Premier and held office until 1904. His government passed the Industrial Arbitration Act in 1901 and the Female Suffrage Act in 1902. On the other hand, poor economic conditions and drought forced the government to abandon an ambitious public works program. Failing health and the death of his wife in March 1904 compelled him to retire in June. He accepted a seat in the Legislative Council, but was unable afterwards to exercise much influence in politics.

Death 
See died at Randwick on 31 January 1907. He fathered ten children and was survived by four daughters and three sons.

See is buried in the Church of England section of what was then known as Long Bay Cemetery (now Randwick cemetery) along with members of his family including his wife Charlotte who died 3 years before him; infant children Percy aged 10 weeks, John Bruce aged 13 months, along with a grandson named Charles Bryen, the youngest son of John Charles Matthews See and his wife Constance L. née Bryen. John Charles Matthews See is also named here, after he died in 1932.

Honours
See was created Knight Commander of the Order of St Michael and St George in 1902. The See Parks in Grafton and Broken Hill are named after him, the one in Broken Hill being dedicated by him in 1902.

References

1844 births
1907 deaths
Australian justices of the peace
English emigrants to Australia
Australian Knights Commander of the Order of St Michael and St George
Australian politicians awarded knighthoods
Mayors of Randwick
Members of the New South Wales Legislative Assembly
Members of the New South Wales Legislative Council
People from Grafton, New South Wales
Premiers of New South Wales
Treasurers of New South Wales
Colonial Secretaries of New South Wales
19th-century Australian politicians
People from Yelling
19th-century Australian businesspeople